New Leinster was a name given to the Stewart Island in the Royal Charter of November 1840, which stated the division of New Zealand into three parts. The division only hold a geographic significance. In 1846 New Zealand Constitution Act, the area known as New Leinster was incorporated into then established New Munster Province. It was named after Leinster, one of the provinces of Ireland.

History 
Following the Treaty of Waitangi, signed on 6 February 1840, New Zealand became a colony of the British Empire, initially administrated as part of the Colony of New South Wales. In the Royal Charter of November 1840, New Zealand was divided into three divisions: New Ulster, New Munster, and New Leinster. Those division only hold a geographic significance. The names of the regions were created by governor William Hobson, who named them after the corresponding provinces of Ireland, with New Leinster being named after the province of Leinster. The Colony of New Zealand became a crown colony of the British Empire on 3 May 1841. The New Zealand Constitution Act of 1846 divided New Zealand into two provinces, New Ulster, and New Munster. The area known as New Leinster was as such incorporated into the province of New Munster.

References

Former subdivisions of New Zealand
Stewart Island
States and territories established in 1840
1840 establishments in New Zealand
States and territories disestablished in 1846
History of Southland, New Zealand